Farmen 2022 (The Farm 2022) is the fifteenth season of the Swedish reality television series Farmen. 17 Swedes from across Sweden live on the farm like it was 100 years prior and compete in tasks to earn money for shopping, animals, tools for the farm, etc. Each week a duel takes place where one contestant is eliminated. In the finals, the final 2 compete in a final duel where the winners walks away with 500,000 kr. and the title of Farmen 2022. Anna Brolin continued as host while Hans Wincent continued as Farm mentor. The season premiered on 9 January 2022 on TV4.

Notes

References

External links

The Farm (franchise)
2022 Swedish television seasons
TV4 (Sweden) original programming